Paisley Abercorn railway station was a railway station in Paisley, Renfrewshire, Scotland. The station was built by the Glasgow and South Western railway when the former Scotch gauge Paisley and Renfrew Railway was converted to Standard Gauge and was joined to the Glasgow and Paisley Joint Railway at Arkleston Junction.

History
The station opened on 1 May 1866, it replaced the earlier terminal station at Paisley Hamilton Street.

The station closed permanently to regular passenger services on 5 June 1967, when passenger services were withdrawn from the branch line.  Freight traffic ceased in 1981 and the track was lifted in 1986.

Both platforms remain, (albeit covered in vegetation) but all buildings have been removed.

The site of the former Paisley Abercorn railway station goods yard was used to build a DIY superstore operated by Tesco in the late 1970s - unlike most Tesco stores, for most of its life it was forbidden to sell food. In the 1980s the store was sold to become a DIY superstore - "Great Mills"; Great Mills has changed ownership and has since been renamed.

See also

Footnotes

References
 Butt, R.V.J. (1995). The Directory of Railway Stations, Sparkford: Patrick Stephens Ltd. .

Disused railway stations in Renfrewshire
Railway stations in Great Britain opened in 1866
Railway stations in Great Britain closed in 1967
Former Glasgow and South Western Railway stations
1866 establishments in Scotland
1967 disestablishments in Scotland
Buildings and structures in Paisley, Renfrewshire
Transport in Paisley, Renfrewshire